The death of David Rossi occurred in Siena, Italy on 6 March 2013. Rossi, head of communications of Banca Monte dei Paschi di Siena, was found dead on the street outside his office in Rocca Salimbeni.

Circumstances 
The incident occurred shortly after the beginning of Financial Police investigations which, on 19 February 2013, searched Rossi's office and house, as well as those of the former president and the former general manager of Rocca Salimbeni, Giuseppe Mussari and Antonio Vigni. However, Rossi was not under investigation. The inquiry dealt with the acquisition of Banca Antonveneta.

Investigations 
On 6 March 2013, David Rossi, born in Siena on 2 June 1961, apparently fell out of his office window and died shortly after. The public prosecutor of Siena investigated the event. Previously two other inquiries had been carried out, which came to the verdict of suicide, even though many elements were never clarified. Only one of the twelve available surveillance cameras could verify the facts.

In July 2013, the widow of Rossi, Antonella Tognazzi, was investigated and then brought to trial, together with journalist Davide Vecchi (at the time envoy of il Fatto Quotidiano), through an own-initiative procedure by magistrate Aldo Natalini, on suspicion of privacy violation: it was the first and only court case in Italy, according to the abstracts of the Court of Cassation. The trial has been the subject of many controversies, which lead to some parliamentary questions and the intervention of international observatory on press freedom at Columbia University of New York, as it was considered an attempt to restrict the right to information. The lawsuit was concluded on January 2018, with the full acquittal and a harsh sentence by judge Alessio Innocenti, who condemned the opening of the investigation file charged to Tognazzi and Vecchi.

Controversies 
The television show Le Iene strongly highlighted the case, pointing out that some of the people involved had attended several sex parties. Due to this the public prosecutor of Genova launched an investigation, searched an envoy of the show Le Iene and collected some documents in his possession.

During the investigation, it turned out that Rossi's watch was not on his wrist at the moment of the fall, but it was thrown out of his office window twenty minutes later.

A magistrate who was investigating the incident was threatened with death when a 9mm handgun bullet was delivered to him.

Camera footage showed that two people approached Rossi while he was still alive, but walked away shortly after, without aiding him.

As a result of the dismissed investigations, in 2020 the public prosecutor of Genova started investigating the magistrates, who were involved in the case to ascertain the correct execution of the activities.

Parliamentary Committee 
On 11 March 2021, the Chamber of Deputies established the Parliamentary Committee of Inquiry on the death of David Rossi, tasked with precisely reconstructing the facts, causes and reasons which lead to the death of Rossi and possible third-party responsibilities. The committee is chaired by the deputy of Forza Italia Pierantonio Zanettin.

References

Further reading
 
 
 
 Davide Vecchi, La verità sul caso David Rossi. Tutto quello che ancora non sapevamo. Chiarelettere, 2022, ISBN 978-8832960747

Year of birth missing (living people)
Living people